The 1952 Northeast Louisiana State Indians football team was an American football team that represented Northeast Louisiana State College (now known as the University of Louisiana at Monroe) as an independent during the 1952 college football season. In their eighteenth year under head coach James L. Malone, the team compiled a 5–4 record.

Schedule

References

Northeast Louisiana
Louisiana–Monroe Warhawks football seasons
Northeast Louisiana State Indians football